Alive and Screamin' is the first live album by the Swiss hard rock band Krokus, recorded on their tour of the United States and Canada in 1986.

Track listing

Personnel
Krokus
Marc Storace – vocals
Fernando von Arb – lead guitar
Mark Kohler – rhythm guitar
Tommy Keiser – bass
Jeff Klaven – drums, percussion
Jai Winding – keyboards

Production
Tony Platt - producer, engineer, mixing at Right Track Recording, New York City
George Marino - mastering at Sterling Sound, New York

Charts

References 

Krokus (band) albums
1986 live albums
Arista Records live albums
Albums produced by Tony Platt